Cape Sudest is a cape in Papua New Guinea, next to Oro Bay. There was an important U.S military base there in World War II. It was situated in Oro Province, about a mile south of Harigo.

Sudest
Oro Province